Precious Cargo is a 2016 Canadian action film directed by Max Adams and written by Adams and Paul V. Seetachitt. The film stars Mark-Paul Gosselaar, Bruce Willis, Claire Forlani, John Brotherton, Lydia Hull, and Daniel Bernhardt. The film was released on April 22, 2016, by Lionsgate Premiere. The film was panned by critics.

Plot
To get back in the good graces of her murderous boss (Bruce Willis), a seductive thief (Claire Forlani) recruits an ex-lover (Mark-Paul Gosselaar) to steal rare and valuable gems.

Cast

Production
The movie was filmed in Gulfport, MS at the Island View Casino and the Port of Gulfport in 2015.

Release
The film was released on April 22, 2016, by Lionsgate Premiere and filming in New York City, New York.

Box office
As of July 24, 2020, Precious Cargo grossed $567,064 in the United Arab Emirates, Portugal, Turkey, United Kingdom, and Thailand.

Reception
On Rotten Tomatoes, it has an approval rating of 0%, based on 22 reviews, with an average rating of 2.6/10. On Metacritic, the film has a weighted average score of 27 out of 100, based on reviews from 4 critics.

Ian Freer of Empire magazine wrote: "In the ’90s it would have been a serviceable DTV alternative when the Van Damme/Jeff Wincott flick was out at Blockbuster. These days it is a lacklustre anachronism. Bruce Willis should really know better."
Peter Bradshaw of The Guardian gave it 1 out of 5 and wrote: "A straight-to-video nightmare is all that's on offer here."

See also
 Bruce Willis filmography

References

External links
 

2016 films
2016 independent films
2016 action thriller films
2016 crime drama films
2016 crime thriller films
Canadian action thriller films
Canadian crime thriller films
Canadian heist films
English-language Canadian films
Lionsgate films
2010s English-language films
2010s Canadian films